Julie Brosseau (born December 29, 1995) is a Quebecoise basketball shooting guard formerly with the Kansas Jayhawks of the Big 12 Conference. Brosseau represented Quebec at the 2017 Jeux de la Francophonie. Brosseau was Team Quebec's leading scorer as the team won a silver medal after losing to France in the final match. Brosseau was Quebec's flag bearer in the closing ceremony. She transferred to Utah in the Pac-12 Conference, averaging 4.7 points per game in the 2019–20 season. She then moved to Kansas as a graduate transfer for the 2020–21 season.

Brosseau is from the Montreal suburb of Repentigny. While attending Collège Montmorency, she was ranked as the 4th best women's basketball prospect in Canada by Crown Scout Magazine. She debuted for the Lady Black Bears during the 2016–17 season.

Maine, Utah and Kansas statistics

Source

References

External links
Kansas Jayhawks bio

1995 births
Living people
Canadian women's basketball players
Canadian expatriate basketball people in the United States
Basketball people from Quebec
People from Repentigny, Quebec
Maine Black Bears women's basketball players
Shooting guards
Utah Utes women's basketball players